Šipačno may refer to:

Šipačno, Nevesinje, a village in Bosnia and Herzegovina
Šipačno, Nikšić, a village in Montenegro